Walter Poppe (5 March 1886 – 24 June 1951) was a German footballer who played for Eintracht Braunschweig and Hannover 96. He was also capped once for the German national team, in a friendly against England. He was Eintracht Braunschweig's first player to receive a cap.

References

External links 
 
 
 Walter Poppe at TeamDeutschland.net 
 

1886 births
1951 deaths
German footballers
Germany international footballers
Association football midfielders
Eintracht Braunschweig players
Hannover 96 players